Craig Smith (born November 10, 1983) is an American former professional basketball player. After playing at Boston College from 2002–2006, he was selected by the Minnesota Timberwolves in the 2006 NBA draft.

High school and college
Smith attended Worcester Academy, a preparatory school in Worcester, Massachusetts, for a year as a postgraduate student before college. He went on to score 2,349 points in his collegiate career, placing him second on Boston College's career scoring list (behind Troy Bell). In his senior season, he had per-game averages of 17.6 points, 9.4 rebounds, 3.0 assists, 1.2 steals, and 0.8 blocked shots.

Professional career
Smith was selected by the Minnesota Timberwolves with the 36th overall pick in the 2006 NBA draft. On August 30, 2006, he signed a multi-year deal with the Timberwolves.

Smith averaged 7.4 points and 5.1 rebounds in his rookie year (2006–07) with the Timberwolves. He earned a starting role for the last five games of the season and averaged 12.0 points and 10.2 rebounds while logging an average 34.4 minutes. He had an increased role in the 2007–08 season after a strong rookie performance and a Vegas Summer League performance during which he averaged 21.8 points and 6.0 rebounds. On December 11, 2007, Smith scored 36 points in an 88–102 loss to the Washington Wizards, logging 38 minutes and making 14 of his 22 field goal attempts. On July 17, 2008, he re-signed with the Timberwolves on a multi-year deal.

On July 20, 2009, Smith was traded, along with Mark Madsen and Sebastian Telfair, to the Los Angeles Clippers for Quentin Richardson. On July 19, 2010, Smith re-signed with the Clippers on a one-year deal.

On December 15, 2011, Smith signed with the Portland Trail Blazers.

On August 11, 2012, Smith signed with Hapoel Jerusalem of Israel for the 2012–13 season. On March 15, 2013, he was released by Hapoel. He later joined the Hong Kong Bulls for the 2013 NBL season.

On March 14, 2014, Smith was acquired by the Sioux Falls Skyforce of the NBA D-League.

On September 23, 2014, Smith signed with Israeli club Ironi Nes Ziona for the 2014–15 season.

In 2019 Craig Smith signed with the Enemies of the Big3.  Entering his first season with the BIG3, Craig Smith was selected with the 10th pick in the second round of the 2019 BIG3 draft.

The Basketball Tournament
Craig Smith played for Team CitiTeam Blazers in the 2018 edition of The Basketball Tournament. CitiTeam Blazers made it to the Second Round before falling to Team Challenge ALS.

NBA career statistics

Regular season 

|-
| align="left" | 
| align="left" | Minnesota
| 82 || 5 || 18.7 || .531 || .000 || .624 || 5.1 || .6 || .6 || .2 || 7.4
|-
| align="left" | 
| align="left" | Minnesota
| 77 || 11 || 20.1 || .563 || .000 || .665 || 4.6 || .8 || .5 || .2 || 9.4
|-
| align="left" | 
| align="left" | Minnesota
| 74 || 31 || 19.7 || .562 || .000 || .677 || 3.8 || 1.1 || .4 || .3 || 10.1
|-
| align="left" | 
| align="left" | L.A. Clippers
| 75 || 2 || 16.4 || .569 || .200 || .635 || 3.8 || 1.1 || .4 || .3 || 7.8
|-
| align="left" | 
| align="left" | L.A. Clippers
| 48 || 0 || 12.2 || .553 || .000 || .735 || 2.4 || .6 || .3 || .1 || 5.4
|-
| align="left" | 
| align="left" | Portland
| 47 || 0 || 9.9 || .504 || .000 || .717 || 2.3 || .4 || .3 || .1 || 3.3
|- class="sortbottom"
| style="text-align:center;" colspan="2"| Career
| 403 || 49 || 16.9 || .553 || .037 || .661 || 3.9 || .8 || .5 || .2 || 7.6

See also
 List of NCAA Division I men's basketball players with 2,000 points and 1,000 rebounds

References

External links

1983 births
Living people
All-American college men's basketball players
American expatriate basketball people in Hong Kong
American expatriate basketball people in Israel
American men's basketball players
Basketball players from Inglewood, California
Big3 players
Boston College Eagles men's basketball players
Fairfax High School (Los Angeles) alumni
Hapoel Jerusalem B.C. players
Ironi Nes Ziona B.C. players
Los Angeles Clippers players
Minnesota Timberwolves draft picks
Minnesota Timberwolves players
Portland Trail Blazers players
Power forwards (basketball)
Universiade gold medalists for the United States
Universiade medalists in basketball
Worcester Academy alumni
Medalists at the 2005 Summer Universiade
American men's 3x3 basketball players